EU3 may refer to:

 EU three, either France, Germany and Italy (largest countries at the founding of the European Union), or France, Germany and the UK (current largest economies in Europe)
 Euro 3, an emission standard for vehicles 
 Europa Universalis III, a computer game by Paradox Interactive